Howell Tong (born in 1944 in Hong Kong) is a statistician who has made fundamental contributions to nonlinear time series analysis, semi-parametric statistics, non-parametric statistics, dimension reduction, model selection, likelihood-free statistics and other areas.  In the words of Professor Peter Whittle (FRS),  ‘The striking feature of Howell Tong’s … is the
continuing freshness, boldness and spirit of enquiry which inform them-indeed, proper qualities for
an explorer. He stands as the recognised innovator and authority in his subject, while remaining
disarmingly direct and enthusiastic .’¹  And his work, in the words of Sir David Cox, ‘links two fascinating fields, nonlinear time series and deterministic dynamical systems.’² 
He is the father of the threshold time series models, which have extensive applications in ecology, economics, epidemiology and finance. (See external links for detail.) Besides nonlinear time series analysis, he was the co-author of a seminal paper, which he read to the Royal Statistical Society, on dimension reduction in semi-parametric statistics by pioneering the approach based on minimum average variance estimation. He has also made numerous novel contributions to nonparametric statistics (obtaining the surprising result that cross-validation does not suffer from the curse of dimensionality for consistent estimation of the embedding dimension of a dynamical system),  Markov chain modelling (with application to weather data), reliability, non-stationary time series analysis (in both the frequency domain and the time domain) and wavelets.

Life 
Since October 1, 2009, he has been an emeritus professor at the London School of Economics and was twice (2009, 2010) holder of the Saw Swee Hock Professorship of Statistics at the National University of Singapore. He was a guest professor, Academy of Mathematics and System Sciences, the Chinese Academy of Sciences from 2000 to 2004, a distinguished visiting professor of statistics at the University of Hong Kong from  2005 to 2013, a distinguished professor-at-large, University of Electronic Science & Technology of China from 2016–2021 and is a distinguished visiting professor, Tsinghua University, China since 2019.

Tong, a scholarship boy, left Wah Yan College  香港華仁書院 (founded by the Irish Jesuits in 1919) in Hong Kong in 1961, and was sent by his father to complete his matriculation at the Barnsbury School for Boys in North London (-one of the earliest comprehensive schools in England, now no longer in existence). He got his Bachelor of Science in 1966 (with first class honours in Mathematics), Master of Science in 1969 and Doctor of Philosophy in 1972,  all from the University of Manchester Institute of Science and Technology (UMIST, now merged into the University of Manchester), where he studied under Maurice Priestley. Tong remained at UMIST first as a lecturer and then as a senior lecturer. While in Manchester, he started his married life with Ann Mary Leong. In 1982, he moved to the Chinese University of Hong Kong as the founding chair of statistics.  Four years later, he returned to England to be chair professor of statistics (and sometime director of the Institute of Mathematics and Statistics) at the University of Kent at Canterbury, a post he held until 1999. He was the first ethnic Chinese to hold such a chair professorship in the UK, thus opening the door for other ethnic Chinese statisticians.  From 1999 to September 2009, Tong was chair professor of statistics at the London School of Economics and founded the Centre for the Analysis of Time Series. Between 1997 and 2004, Tong was concurrently chair professor of statistics, founding dean of the graduate school and later pro-vice chancellor, University of Hong Kong.

Tong was elected a member of the International Statistical Institute in 1983. In 1986, he was the session organiser and an invited speaker of the session on time series analysis, at the First World Congress of the Bernoulli Society, held at Tashkent in the former Soviet Union. In 1994, he was the Special Plenary Lecturer at the 15th Nordic Meeting in Mathematical Statistics, held at Lund, Sweden. In 1999, he delivered the Alan T. Craig lecture at the University of Iowa, US.   He was elected a  Fellow of the Institute of Mathematical Statistics in 1993, an Honorary Fellow of the Institute of Actuaries, England in 1999, and a Foreign Member of the Norwegian Academy of Science and Letters in 2000. In 2000, he became the first statistician to win the (class II) State Prize in Natural Sciences in China. In 2002, the University of Hong Kong gave him their then-highest award, the Distinguished Research Achievement Award, carrying with it a research grant of HK$1,000,000 per annum for three years.  The Royal Statistical Society, UK, awarded him their Guy Medal in Silver in 2007 in recognition of his "...many important contributions to time series analysis over a distinguished career and in particular for his fundamental and highly influential paper "Threshold autoregression, limit cycles and cyclical data", read to the society in 1980, which paved the way for a major body of work in non-linear time series modelling." In 2011, he delivered the Paolu Hsu lecture at the Peking University, China. In 2012, the International Chinese Statistical Association awarded him the Distinguished Achievement Award.  In 2014, he held a senior fellowship at the Institute of Advanced Studies, University of Bologna, Italy.

Tong has one son, one daughter and three grandchildren.

¹ page vi, https://books.google.com/books?id=g6dpDQAAQBAJ&pg=PR6
² page 206,https://books.google.com/books?id=g6dpDQAAQBAJ&pg=PR6

Bibliography

Notes

External links

Norwegian Academy of Science and Letters 
https://dnva.no/medlemmer/53
Published Papers https://www.dropbox.com/sh/vl7nfw18cczq5g8/AAC2xx_P__nKAmryN9wsbLvSa?dl=0
A conversation with Howell Tong 
An interview with Howell Tong https://www.degruyter.com/view/journals/snde/ahead-of-print/article-10.1515-snde-2019-0097/article-10.1515-snde-2019-0097.xml
Exploration of a nonlinear world: An appreciation of Howell Tong’s contributions to Statistics
Poems and writings http://howelltongblog.blogspot.co.uk/

An interview with Howell Tong (透過時間了解世界）

International Conference in Honour of Howell Tong: Nonlinear Time Series: Threshold Modelling and Beyond Analysis 2009
Threshold models for animal population dynamics

1944 births
Living people
Fellows of the Institute of Mathematical Statistics
Statisticians
Hong Kong people
Alumni of the University of Manchester Institute of Science and Technology
Academics of the University of North London
Academics of the University of Manchester Institute of Science and Technology
Academics of the University of Kent
Academics of the London School of Economics
Members of the Norwegian Academy of Science and Letters